Sir Rowland Arthur Charles Sperling KCMG CB (1874–1965) was a British diplomat who served as ambassador to Finland, Bulgaria, and Switzerland.

Early life
Sperling was born in 1874 in London, England the son of Commander Rowland Money Sperling (1841–), RN, and Marian Charlotte, daughter of Charles Keyser. He was educated at Eton College and New College Oxford in 1892. He left New College in 1899 without a degree and went to work as a clerk in the Foreign Office.

Diplomat
He was sent to Russia in 1902 to learn Russian before becoming acting third secretary in St Petersburg in the Diplomatic Service. He returned to the Foreign Office in 1905 first as an assistant clerk, then a senior clerk and in 1914 Head of the Western Department. He stayed in the Foreign Office during the first world war and was an attached to the Paris Peace Conference : assistant secretary Foreign Office 1919. In 1920, he represented the United Kingdom at a conference on international communications in Washington. By 1924 he was transferred to the Diplomatic Service and he was appointed Minister at Berne, envoy extraordinary and minister plenipotentiary to Switzerland 1924–28. In 1928 he moved as Minister to Sofia, Bulgaria 1928–9, and then to Finland 1930–35. He retired from the service in 1935.

Family life
In 1905, Sperling married Dorothy Constance Kingsmill (1874–1951), daughter of William Howley Kingsmill (1838–1894), DL, JP, of Sydmonton Court, Sydmonton, and Constance Mary(died 1947), daughter of Sir Wyndham Spencer Portal, 1st Bt. They had two sons and a daughter. One son was killed on active service in a flying accident at Manston Airport in March 1940. His wife died in 1951.

Following retirement to Kingsclere, Hampshire,  he was a member of Hampshire County Council from 1936 to 1949, and High Sheriff of Hampshire from 1945 to 1946. Sperling died on 8 January 1965 at his home in Wiltshire aged 91.

Honours and awards
In the 1921 Birthday Honours he was invested as a Companion of the Order of St Michael and St George (CMG);
On  he was invested as a Companion of the Order of the Bath;
In the 1934 New Year Honours, Sperling was invested as a Knight Commander of the Order of St Michael and St George (KCMG).

References

1874 births
1965 deaths
Ambassadors of the United Kingdom to Switzerland
Ambassadors of the United Kingdom to Finland
Ambassadors of the United Kingdom to Bulgaria
Knights Commander of the Order of St Michael and St George
Companions of the Order of the Bath
Alumni of New College, Oxford
High Sheriffs of Hampshire
People educated at Eton College
Burials in Hampshire
People from Kingsclere